Bash! is the third studio album and the first holiday album from the a cappella group Rockapella.

Track listing

Personnel
Scott Leonard – high tenor
Sean Altman – tenor
Elliott Kerman – baritone
Barry Carl – bass

Special appearances
Lisa Leonard – "Holiday Groove"

1992 albums
1992 Christmas albums
Rockapella albums